The Minister of Materials was a short-lived ministerial office in the Government of the United Kingdom, in charge of the Ministry of Materials. Created on 6 July 1951, the office was wound up on 16 August 1954. Most of its holders also held another ministerial office.

The establishment of the Ministry was set out in command paper Cmd. 8278 "Ministry of Materials", presented to Parliament in June 1951.

Office-holders

 1951: Richard Stokes (also Lord Privy Seal)
 1951: Viscount Swinton (also Chancellor of the Duchy of Lancaster)
 1952: Sir Arthur Salter
 1953: Lord Woolton  (also Chancellor of the Duchy of Lancaster)

Lists of government ministers of the United Kingdom
1951 establishments in the United Kingdom
1954 disestablishments in the United Kingdom
1950s in the United Kingdom
Defunct ministerial offices in the United Kingdom
Ministries established in 1951
Government agencies disestablished in 1954